The 2017 Shymkent Challenger was a professional tennis tournament played on clay courts. It was the first edition of the tournament which was part of the 2017 ATP Challenger Tour. It took place in Shymkent, Kazakhstan between 22 and 27 May 2017.

Singles main-draw entrants

Seeds

 1 Rankings are as of 15 May 2017.

Other entrants
The following players received wildcards into the singles main draw:
  Andrey Golubev
  Roman Khassanov
  Alex Molčan
  Kenneth Raisma

The following player received entry into the singles main draw using a protected ranking:
  Javier Martí

The following players received entry from the qualifying draw:
  Andriej Kapaś 
  Evgeny Karlovskiy
  Evgenii Tiurnev
  Ilya Vasilyev

Champions

Singles

 Ričardas Berankis def.  Yannick Hanfmann 6–3, 6–2.

Doubles

 Hans Podlipnik Castillo /  Andrei Vasilevski def.  Clément Geens /  Juan Pablo Paz 6–4, 6–2.

References

Shymkent Challenger
Shymkent Challenger